The Iran Language Institute, abbreviated as ILI is a state-owned, non-profit organization founded in 1979 in Iran with the national mission of developing foreign language learning. It is a subsidiary of Institute for the Intellectual Development. The headquarters of this institute is located in the country's capital, Tehran. The ILI, currently having around 200 centers in 73 cities, offers language courses in Persian, English, French, German, Russian, Spanish and Arabic to around 240,000 learners.

Before 1979 
The Iran Language Institute, previously referred to as Iran–America Society, was established in 1925 in Tehran. In the past, Iran America Society provided various educational services including teaching English to business people and employees in both public and private sectors, and also teaching Persian to foreigners.

After the Islamic Revolution, this society affiliated with the Institute for the Intellectual Development of Children and Young Adults and, therefore, expanded its services.

Levels to go before TOEFL (English)
 Basic (in 3 books)
 Elementary (in 3 books)
 Pre Intermediate (in 3 books)
 Intermediate (in 3 books)
 High Intermediate (in 3 books)+ A Mini Dictionary
 Advanced (in 3 books) + A Mini Dictionary
Advancedes term is for exams tofel
 and ielts and Jce and sce and pte.

Arabic Levels
 Basic /  (in 1 book)
 Elementary /  (in 4 books)
 Intermediate / (in 4 books)
 Advanced /  (in 4 books)

French
The French department of the ILI was established in 1981. At the beginning, there were only 5 levels of general and audio visual classes, but now there are 20 levels ranging from the beginning to advanced classes held in Tehran and some other cities including Mashhad, Esfahan, Tabriz, Shiraz, and Karaj.

German
The German department of the ILI, established in 1993 in cooperation with Carl Duisburg Center, has always tried to use modern teaching methods. There are nine levels based on Schritte series, and five complementary levels based on Aspekte method.

Schritte educational package is used in the first nine levels from GA1 to GA9. This is one of the newest packages for learning German which has been published in six volumes by Hueber publications. Those who successfully finish the course will be able to communicate and compose letters in German. In this method, grammar is presented in a simple and understandable way and vocabulary items are presented along with appealing pictures.

Aspekte educational package is used in the second five levels from MA1 to MA5. It has been published in two volumes by Langenscheidt. Using this method, the learners get familiar with longer and more difficult written texts and audios. They will also be able to enrich their knowledge of grammar and vocabulary and strengthen their writing and speaking skills to an advanced level. They will also get familiar with the German literature.

Spanish
The international examination of Spanish (DELE) is simultaneously administered in 86 countries by Servantes Institute every year. The exam is administered in three levels (Básico, Intermedio, Superiory) in Iran by the embassy of Spain. Considering the growing political, cultural, and business relations between Iran and the Spanish speaking countries, the ILI has established the Spanish language department using methods and textbooks approved by Instituto Cervantes in Madrid.

Spanish Courses for Adults are in Elementary, Intermediate, Advanced, and Upper Advanced levels.

See also
Education in Iran
Institute for the Intellectual Development of Children and Young Adults
Iran–America Society

References

External links
 Official ILI webSite
 Useful Files Iranian languages (Persian)

Education in Iran
Non-profit organisations based in Iran